Group A of the 2010 Fed Cup Europe/Africa Zone Group I was one of four pools in the Europe/Africa Zone Group I of the 2010 Fed Cup. Four teams competed in a round-robin competition, with the top team and the bottom team proceeding to their respective sections of the play-offs: the top team played for advancement to the World Group II Play-offs, while the bottom team faced potential relegation to Group II.

Belarus vs. Austria

Great Britain vs. Bosnia and Herzegovina

Belarus vs. Bosnia and Herzegovina

Great Britain vs. Austria

Belarus vs. Great Britain

Austria vs. Bosnia and Herzegovina

See also
Fed Cup structure

References

External links
 Fed Cup website

2010 Fed Cup Europe/Africa Zone